Marco Cornaro also Marco Corner (1557 – 11 June 1625) was a Roman Catholic prelate who served as Bishop of Padua (1594–1625).

Biography
Marco Cornaro was born in Venice, Italy in 1557. On 12 December 1594, he was appointed during the papacy of Pope Clement VIII as Bishop of Padua.
On 21 December 1594, he was consecrated bishop by Agostino Valier, Bishop of Verona, with Francesco Cornaro (iuniore), Bishop of Treviso, and Antonio Grimani, Bishop of Torcello, serving as co-consecrators. He served as Bishop of Padua until his death on 11 June 1625.

Episcopal succession
While bishop, he was the principal consecrator of:
Ubertinus Papafava, Bishop of Adria;
and principal co-consecrator of:

See also
Catholic Church in Italy

References

16th-century Roman Catholic bishops in the Republic of Venice
17th-century Roman Catholic bishops in the Republic of Venice
Bishops appointed by Pope Clement VIII
Marco
1594 births
1625 deaths